Gopachal rock-cut Jain monuments, also called Gopachal Parvat Jaina monuments, are a group of Jain carvings dated to between 7th and 15th century. They are located around the walls of the Gwalior Fort, Madhya Pradesh. They depict Tirthankaras in seated Padmasana posture as well as standing Kayotsarga posture, in the typical naked form of Jain iconography.

The number of Jain rock shrines at Gwalior, with numerous monumental statues, is unmatched anywhere else. James Burgess writes: "In the 15th century, during the reign of the Tomara Rajas, the Jains seem to have been seized with an uncontrollable impulse to convert the cliff that sustains the fort into a great shrine in honour of their religion, and in a few years excavated the most extensive series of Jaina caves known to exist anywhere."

The Gopachal Jain collosi cave temple is one of the Archaeological Survey of India's Adarsh Smarak Monument along with other monuments in the Gwalior Fort.

Location

The Gopachal rock-cut Jain monuments are located on the rock cliffs of the hill topped by the Gwalior Fort, Madhya Pradesh. Gopachal is the old designation of the Gwalior Fort.

There are five clusters of monuments that surround the hill, as can be seen in the 1901 map.

 South-East Group: Popularly referred to as Ek Patthar Ki Bawadi group, the cluster is now termed the "Gopachal Atishya Kshetra" by the local Jain community. The group includes 26 caves in a row spanning about half a mile. There are 13 inscriptions from 1468-1473 AD. The entrance to the site is close to the Dindayal City Mall.
 South-West Group: Now termed Trishalagiri. The group is the first one encountered when driving to the Urvai Gate, just outside the fortifications. There are the oldest Jain monuments in Gwalior from the post-Gupta period. Archaeologist L.B. Singh dates them to 6th to 8th cent AD.
 Urvahi group: In both sides of the road, just before entering the hilltop fort gate. These are the most visited since they are visible from the road itself. There are six inscriptions from 1440–1453 AD.
 North-West group: Now termed Naminath Giri group after Lord Naminath. They are hard to access. There is an inscription of 1470 AD. The group appears to have escaped the destruction by Babur, and thus the monumental image of Lord Naminath is in its pristine form.
 North-East group: Now termed Naimgir group after Lord Neminath.

Alexander Cunningham noted a Jain temple converted into a mosque just north of the Sas-Bahu temples in the fort containing a Jain inscription of AD 1108. Also within the fort there is an abandoned Jain temple which is now within the Scindia School playground and thus no longer accessible. Several large Jain sculptures are placed within the Teli ka Mandir compound.

The Gwalior city and the fort is connected to other Indian cities by major highways NH 44 and 46 (Asian Highway 43 and 47), a railway station and airport (IATA: GWL). It is located near other historic Hindu and Jain temples from the medieval era.

History

Both monuments were defaced and desecrated around 1527 when the Emperor Babur ordered their destruction., Quote: "In 1527, the Urvahi Jinas were mutilated by the Mughal emperor Babar, a fact he records in his memoirs".Centuries later, the Jain community restored many of the statues by adding back stucco heads on the top of the damaged idols.

The prolific Apabhramsha author Raidhu was responsible for consecrating many of the Jain rock carved images as attested by multiple inscriptions. These include the two colossal images of Shri Adinatha (57 feet) and Shri Chandraprabha.

Kurbuddin Aibak captured the fort from Parihars in 1196 AD and held it until his death in 1210. Altmash captured the fort in 1232 and built the fortifications at the Urvahi gate.  The Tomars acquired control in 1394 and held it until 1517.

Mughal Emperor Babar conquered Gwalior in AD 1527. Babar ordered the destruction of the Jain statues, as he mentions in his memoirs. The heads of the statues at Urvahi gate and the Ek Patthat ki Bawadi were damaged. The Urvahi gate sculptures were repaired at some later time by the local Jains. The South-West Group and North West group sculptures survived because they were in inconspicuous and hard to reach places.  and The Mughals kept control until Muhammad Shah. Scindias, the Maratha clan, took control in 1731. Shortly before that, Jain temples were constructed again in Gwalior city in 1704 AD, including the Jain Golden Temple, Gwalior.

Description 
The Gopachal rock-cut monuments depict the Tirthankaras in seated or standing meditating positions. They are not as colossal as some of those found in the Siddhachal Caves, but they are big. The Gopachal monuments include standing and seated Shri Rishabhanatha (Adinatha), Neminatha, Parshvanatha and Shri Mahavirasvami. 

The mulnayak of the complex is a  idol of Parshvanatha, the largest idol of Parshvanatha in lotus position. According to Jains, Tirthankara Parshvanath delivered his discourse (deshna) on this hill.

Gallery

Transport 
The nearest airport is Gwalior.

See also
 Jain art
 Gwalior
 Siddhachal Caves Gwalior Fort  Urwahi Valley/Gate area
Raidhu, the Gopachal Prathishacharya

References

Citations

Sources

External links
   The Rock-cut Jain Monuments of Gwalior – Introduction, Kevin Standage, MARCH 25, 2019
 Gopachal Ek Patthar Ki Bavadi Streetview

Hills of Madhya Pradesh
Gwalior
7th-century Jain temples
Jain temples in Madhya Pradesh
Jain rock-cut architecture
Tourist attractions in Gwalior
Colossal Jain statues in India